Quercus coahuilensis is a species of plant in the family Fagaceae. It is endemic to the Mexican state of Coahuila. It is placed in section Lobatae.

References

coahuilensis
Flora of Northeastern Mexico
Endemic oaks of Mexico
Trees of Coahuila
Data deficient plants
Taxonomy articles created by Polbot
Plants described in 1993